Mekosuchus is a genus of extinct Australasian crocodiles within the subfamily Mekosuchinae. They are believed to have been made extinct by the arrival of humans on the South Pacific islands where they lived. The species of this genus were small in size, 2 m in maximum length, and terrestrial, making them the last surviving group of fully terrestrial crocodilians, leaving only semi-terrestrial species such as the Cuban crocodile and the dwarves Osteolaemus and Paleosuchus.

Fossils of related mekosuchines, such as Trilophosuchus, have been found from Miocene Australia (the earliest known mekosuchine is the Eocene genus Kambara), while Quinkana survived until the arrival of humans. Mekosuchus survived until the Holocene, and their sub-fossils have been found in New Caledonia and Vanuatu.

Species 

There are currently four species of Mekosuchus recognised. The first discovered (and youngest) is the type species M. inexpectatus from the Holocene of New Caledonia which became extinct at some point in the last 4,000 years, most likely with the arrival of humans in the archipelago. Mekosuchus had specialized back teeth for cracking mollusk shells and arthropod carapaces, an adaptation in response to the lack of large ground-dwelling prey in New Caledonia; although it was likely also an opportunistic hunter that went after lizards and various-sized birds when possible.

Another Holocene species is known, M. kalpokasi which lived on the island of Éfaté of Vanuatu approximately 3,000 years ago and likewise disappeared with the arrival of humans.

M. whitehunterensis, the oldest known species, lived during the late Oligocene in Queensland, Australia. M. sanderi also lived in Queensland but later, during the Miocene.

Phylogeny
A 2018 tip dating study by Lee & Yates simultaneously using morphological, molecular (DNA sequencing), and stratigraphic (fossil age) data established the inter-relationships within Crocodylia. The cladogram below shows the placement of Mekosuchus within Mekosuchinae:

See also
 Biodiversity of New Caledonia
 Holocene extinction

References

Mekosuchinae
Neogene crocodylomorphs
Oligocene crocodylomorphs
Miocene crocodylomorphs
Terrestrial crocodylomorphs
New Caledonia Holocene fauna
Holocene extinctions
Pliocene crocodylomorphs
Pleistocene crocodylomorphs
Taxa named by Jean-Christophe Balouet
Prehistoric pseudosuchian genera